African Hunting Holiday is a 2008 British documentary by Louis Theroux.

Theroux journeys to Limpopo Province, South Africa to join the foreign holidaymakers who flock there to hunt big game in so-called "canned" safaris where animals are purpose bred to be hunted in enclosures, including controversial animals such as lions. The documentary features not only the hunters but also the individuals who run the safaris, and the effects they have on the numbers of certain species in these areas.

Reception

The programme received mixed reviews.

References

Louis Theroux's BBC Two specials
BBC television documentaries
2008 television specials
Television episodes set in South Africa
BBC travel television series